Inscription "B" is a survey mark that was left at the confluence of the Colorado and Green rivers in Utah in 1889 by the Robert Brewster Stanton party as they surveyed a railway route. The inscription reads:

STA 84. 89 + 50
D. C. C. &.P. R.R.

May 4th 1 8 8 9 

Stanton and his crew were surveying for a proposed railroad, the Denver, Colorado Canyon and Pacific Railroad (D.C.C. & P.), which was planned to run from Grand Junction, Colorado to the Gulf of California. The railroad was never built.

The site was placed on the National Register of Historic Places on October 7, 1988.

References

Rail infrastructure on the National Register of Historic Places in Utah
National Register of Historic Places in Wayne County, Utah
National Register of Historic Places in Canyonlands National Park